Liseh Rud (also Romanized as Līseh Rūd and Līsehrūd) is a village in Moridan Rural District, Kumeleh District, Langarud County, Gilan Province, Iran. At the 2006 census, its population was 544, in 155 families.

References 

Populated places in Langarud County